Alethia Annette Lewis Hoage Phinazee (July 23, 1920 – September 17, 1983, Durham, North Carolina) was the first woman and the first black American woman to earn the doctorate in library science from Columbia University. She was called a trailblazer for her work as a librarian and educator.

Early life and education
Phinazee was born on July 23, 1920, in Orangeburg, South Carolina. Her parents, William Charles and Althia Lightner Lewis, were educators.

Phinazee attended the public schools of Orangeburg and graduated with a Bachelor of Arts degree in modern foreign languages from Fisk University in 1939. She received the bachelor of library science degree in 1941 and the master of library science degree in 1948 from the University of Illinois. In 1961 she was the first woman and the first black American woman to earn the doctorate in library science from Columbia University. Her dissertation, "The Library of Congress Classification in the United States: A survey of opinions and practices with attention to the problems of structure and application", has been described as a seminal work in library science. Her research, which examined how Library of Congress Classification was used by librarians and library patrons, was one of the first instances where patron use of the system was considered.

Career
Phinazee started her teaching career in North Carolina at the Caswell County Training School from 1939 to 1940 as a teacher-librarian. She was a cataloguer in the library at Talladega College in Alabama from 1941 to 1942. From 1942 until 1944 she held the position of journalism librarian at Lincoln University of Missouri. She taught cataloging and classification courses at the Atlanta University School of Library Service (1946–57).  Phinazee served for a period of time as a cataloguer at Southern Illinois University (1957–62). She returned to Atlanta University as head of special services, which included the administration of the Trevor Arnett Library's Negro Collection – a world-renowned depository of American Africana (1962–67) – and returned to a professorship at the School of Library Service (1963–69). In 1969 Phinazee took the assistant directorship of the Cooperative College Library Center in Atlanta. This was a library-centered service adjunct of the United Board for College Development whose mission was to develop college libraries in the historically black college and university sector of American academia. She was elected the first black president of the North Carolina Library Association in 1975. She was renowned by colleagues as an educator and counselor to generations of black American librarians, receiving honors from the American Library Association Black Caucus in 1978.

Legacy
Phinazee died on September 17, 1983, in Durham, North Carolina. In 1984 the Annette Lewis Phinazee Award was established at the NCCU School of Library and Information Sciences. The award was conceived as a memorial to her work to improve the people of North Carolina's access to African-American children's literature and is awarded each year to an individual or organization doing similar work. She was posthumously awarded the North Carolina Library Association's Distinguished Service Award in 1989.

Notes

References

1920 births
1983 deaths
African-American librarians
American librarians
American women librarians
Clark Atlanta University faculty
Fisk University alumni
University of Illinois alumni
People from Orangeburg, South Carolina
Columbia University School of Library Service alumni
20th-century African-American women
20th-century African-American people
20th-century American people
American women academics